The 1911 University of Utah football team was an American football team that represented the University of Utah as a member of the Rocky Mountain Conference (RMC) during the 1911 college football season. In its second season under head coach Fred Bennion, the team compiled an overall record of 5–1–1 record with a mark of 3–1–1 against conference opponents, finished second in RMC, shut out five of seven opponents, and outscored all opponents by a total of 200 to 15. The team played its home games at Cummings Field in Salt Lake City. Lon Romney was the team captain.

Schedule

References

University of Utah
Utah Utes football seasons
University of Utah football